Iterative refinement is an iterative method proposed by James H. Wilkinson to improve the accuracy of numerical solutions to systems of linear equations.

When solving a linear system  due to the compounded accumulation of rounding errors, the computed solution  may sometimes deviate from the exact solution  Starting with  iterative refinement computes a sequence  which converges to  when certain assumptions are met.

Description
For  the th iteration of iterative refinement consists of three steps:

If the residual is small in some sense, then the correction must also be small, and should at the very least steer the current estimate of the answer, closer to the desired one, 

The iterations will stop on their own when the residual  is zero, or close enough to zero that the corresponding correction  is too small to change the solution  which produced it; alternatively, the algorithm stops when  is too small to convince the linear algebraist monitoring the progress that it is worth continuing with any further refinements.

Note that the matrix equation solved in step (ii) uses the same matrix  for each iterations. If the matrix equation is solved using a direct method, such as 

Error analysis

More formally, assuming that each step (ii) can be solved reasonably accurately, i.e., in mathematical terms, for every , we have

where , the relative error in the -th iterate of iterative refinement satisfies

where
  denotes the -norm of a vector,
if  is "not too badly conditioned", which in this context means

All other computations are assumed to be carried out with unit round-off .

References

Numerical linear algebra